Mark Nawaqanitawase (pronounced  ) (born 11 September 2000) is an Australian rugby union player who plays for the NSW Waratahs in Super Rugby and Australian national team, the Wallabies.

Early life
Nawaqanitawase is of Fijian heritage, and was born and raised in Burwood, New South Wales. Nawaqanitawase played rugby league for Concord-Burwood Wolves and Leichhardt Wanderers in his youth, until he swapped over to rugby union at 14-years-old.

Rugby union career

Domestic rugby

Nawaqanitawase's primary playing position is wing, however he is also capable at fullback.

Nawaqanitawase played schoolboy rugby for St Patrick's College, Strathfield. As an adult, he began his first-class career with Eastwood RFC in the Shute Shield competition. As of 2022, he has been capped 5 times and has scored one try.

With his similarities in height, position, body type, and playing style, Nawaqanitawase has been likened to former Waratahs fullback and dual Australia – Tonga representative Israel Folau.

NSW Country

2018 – 19
Nawaqanitawase began his professional career in 2018, signing with the NSW Country Eagles in the National Rugby Championship. He scored his first professional try in a 24-24 draw against the Fijian Drua on the 14th of September 2019. He scored another three tries in a year which saw the Eagles win the Horan-Little Shield for the first time since 2016.

Following the 2019 season, the NRC competition was disbanded including franchises.

NSW Waratahs

2020 – 22
Nawaqanitawase signed to the Waratahs squad for the 2020 season. He made his Super Rugby debut against the Crusaders on the 1st of February 2020, scoring two tries in a 42–23 loss. He scored another try the following week against the Blues. Nawaqanitawase finished his debut season having played 9 matches and scoring 4 tries.

In 2021, despite a disappointing year for the club, Nawaqanitawase extended his contract with the Waratahs until the end of the 2023 season.

Nawaqanitawase had a breakout 2022 Super Rugby Pacific season, starting in 10 of his 12 matches, scoring seven tries and playing a total of 842' in a year which saw the Waratahs finish 6th on the ladder and reach the Quarter-finals.

International rugby

Australia U20
Nawaqanitawase was a part of the U20 side that won their first title of the 2019 Oceania Rugby U20 Championship. Nawaqanitawase played twice and scored twice, with both tries being scored against Japan U20.

In the 2019 World Rugby U20 Championship, Nawaqanitawase played all five of the Junior Wallabies' matches, including the final against France in which he scored the second-fastest try in a World Rugby U20 Championship final. Unfortunately, the Junior Wallabies lost by one point: 23–24.

Australia A
In 2022, following an incredibly successful year with the Waratahs, Nawaqanitawase was named in the Australia A squad for the Pacific Nations Cup. Australia A finished runner–up in the tournament. Nawaqanitawase was again named in the Australia A squad for the three-match series against Japan. He played in two matches and scored two tries in the series win.

Australia
In 2022, following a successful campaign with both Australia A and the Waratahs, Nawaqanitawase was named in the Australian squad for the 2022 Autumn internationals series.

On the 13th of November, 2022, Nawaganitawase was named in the number 14 jersey in his debut match against Italy which the Wallabies lost 28 to 27. 

On the 27th of November 2022, Nawaganitawase scored two tries against Wales helping leading the Wallabies to a 39 to 34 win.

Reference list

External links
 
 Rugby.com.au profile

2000 births
Australian people of Fijian descent
Australian rugby union players
Living people
Rugby union wings
New South Wales Waratahs players
Rugby union fullbacks
New South Wales Country Eagles players
Rugby union players from Sydney
21st-century Australian people
Rugby sevens players at the 2022 Commonwealth Games
Australia international rugby union players